Delta Community Credit Union is a credit union headquartered in Georgia, a state in the United States.  Delta Community Credit Union has $8.5B in assets and more than 430,000 members.  USA Credit Unions has ranked Delta Community as among the top 25 largest credit unions in the U.S.  Members include residents in 16 Atlanta metro area counties. The credit union serves the following companies: Delta Air Lines, Chick-fil-A, RaceTrac and UPS. As a not-for-profit credit union, their earnings must be returned to their members. According to Credit Unions Online, "the largest credit union in Georgia is Delta Community Credit Union...".  Delta Community is a state-chartered credit union organized under the Georgia Department of Banking and Finance and federally insured by the National Credit Union Share Insurance Fund. There are 30 branch offices. It is a member of CO-OP, formerly known as CU Service Centers, a nationwide cooperative that has 3,500 member credit unions with +5,000 branches.

History
In February 1940, Delta Employees Credit Union was formed in Atlanta, Georgia, by eight Delta Air Lines employees, each with a stake of $45 in share capital. On March 8, 1940, Delta Employees Credit Union received a charter entitling it to 20 years of operation. One month later, the first board of directors was composed. The board voted that membership was open to all Delta employees. By the end of 1940 assets were approximately $2,000.

In 1960, the board granted a renewal of the credit union's charter. By 1983, assets were +$200M. Delta Employees Credit Union was then and is now the largest credit union in Georgia.

On March 8, 1990, Delta Employees Credit Union held its 50th anniversary.

In July 1994, the credit union implemented a policy of "Once a member, always a member," thus eliminating the stipulation that an individual had to be an active Delta employee to be a member. Membership was also extended to the parents of active and former Delta employees in good standing.  In 1995 the Delta Employees Credit Union's total number of members exceeded the 100,000 mark. Membership privileges were offered to children, grandparents, grandchildren, brothers and sisters of the member and their spouses. In 2001, domestic partners of members were added.

In October 2005, Delta Employees Credit Union changed their name to Delta Community Credit Union to describe that they were open to the metro Atlanta community, not just Delta Air Line employees.

In 2010, Delta Community offered Mobile Banking as an option to members.

In 2013, Hank Halter was appointed President and CEO of Delta Community Credit Union and named an Atlanta top 100 leaders in finance by the Atlanta Business Chronicle.

In May 2019, Delta Community opened its 29th branch. In July 2019, Delta Community achieved membership of more than 400,000.

Membership
Membership is open to anyone who lives or works in the Georgia counties of Butts, Cherokee, Clayton, Cobb, Coweta, DeKalb, Douglas, Fayette, Forsyth, Fulton, Gwinnett, Hall, Henry, Paulding, Rockdale, and Spalding.  Current, former or retired employees of various companies throughout the U.S. may also join.

Branch locations

Delta Community Credit Union has branch locations in the states of Georgia, Kentucky, Texas and Utah. Delta Community Credit Union branch locations include: Alpharetta, Atlanta, Buford, Canton, Cumming, Decatur, Douglasville, Duluth, Fayetteville, Gainesville, Johns Creek, Marietta, McDonough, Newnan, Peachtree City, Sandy Springs, Snellville, and Stockbridge. City locations outside of Georgia include: Florence, Kentucky; Southlake, Texas and Salt Lake City, Utah.

Delta Community Credit Union expanded its administrative offices in November 2017.  The administrative offices and conference center are now located at 3300 Riverwood Parkway, Atlanta, GA.

Services
Delta Community Credit Union offers personal banking services, small business, and commercial banking services such as checking accounts, savings accounts, health savings accounts, credit card accounts, online banking, online bill pay, new car loans, used car loans, student loans, personal loans, vacation loans, RV loans, boat loans, home equity loans, home mortgages and consumer loans. Commercial banking and services offered are: commercial real estate lending, SBA 504, equipment and vehicle financing, and lines of credit. The credit union also provides financial planning services and insurance through a subsidiary.

References

Banks established in 1940
Credit unions based in Georgia (U.S. state)
Mutual companies of the United States
Delta Air Lines